Hatzic is a historic community in the Central Fraser Valley region of the Lower Mainland of British Columbia, Canada, located on the east side of the District of Mission and including areas beyond the municipal boundary to the east and northeast.

Hatzic is the location of two very important historical sites in British Columbia, the mission school of the Oblate Fathers (OMI), St. Mary's Indian Residential School, the name sake of the District of Mission, and Xá:ytem, an archaeological site and museum dating to 9,000 years B.P. Also notable is Ferncliff Gardens, a private floral operation now becoming a heritage site. Hatzic Slough, which is part of the drainage for the oxbow Hatzic Lake, is the site of one of the world's largest dry-sorting yards for raw timber. A former railway station named Hatzic was located between the outlet of Hatzic Lake and the foot of the rise to the benchland where most of residential Hatzic is today.

Mission's Fraser River Heritage Park is to the west and incorporates lands formerly belonging to the Oblate mission, including the foundations of the original school, though it is accessed from Mission proper, not via Hatzic.

Hatzic is one of Mission's older suburban neighbourhoods and is home to Hatzic Secondary School and various elementary schools. Overlooking it from above is Westminster Abbey, a Benedictine monastery established in the 1950s, which is part of the Ferndale neighbourhood of Mission. Across the floodplain from the benchland Hatzic proper overlooks and where Hatzic Valley is located is the community of Dewdney, standing astride the bridge where British Columbia Highway 7 leads onto Nicomen Island. Across the Fraser River from Hatzic is the northeast sector of Matsqui Prairie.

Climate
Hatzic has an oceanic climate (Köppen climate type Cfb).

Related names and local geography

Related names, which more or less are also considered part of Hatzic, are Hatzic Island, which is in the centre of Hatzic Lake, north of which are the farming communities of Hatzic Prairie and Durieu, which together form part of the Hatzic Valley, along with communities to the north of Hatzic Prairie around Allan Lake, McConnell Creek and Miracle Valley. The Hatzic Valley forms the southern portion of Electoral Area 'F' of the Fraser Valley Regional District and comprises the old course of the Stave River's glacier and its terminal moraine at the north end of the valley, most of which is fertile floodplain.

References

Unincorporated settlements in British Columbia
Populated places on the Fraser River
Mission, British Columbia